The Tour de Korea is an annual professional road bicycle racing stage race held in South Korea since 2000 as part of the UCI Asia Tour. It was rated by the International Cycling Union (UCI) as a 2.2 category race between 2005 and 2013, then promoted to 2.1 category in 2014. The race is organised by the Korea Cycling Federation.

History
The tour gained international attention when Lance Armstrong, a seven-time Tour de France winner, participated in 2007. Armstrong, having retired from cycling at that time, did not compete, but for the sake of publicity, he rode one lap around the course of the first stage on his mountain bicycle.

Tour de Korea is the only international cycling competition in South Korea. The predecessor to Tour de Korea was stopped in 1997 due to financial strains. Tour de Korea is divided into two divisions: Elite for invitees and competitive cyclists, and a "Special race" for cycling club teams. The prize money for the 2011 tour totaled 200 million Won.

The tour comprises exclusively point-to-point road race stages. Unlike the major tours in Europe, such as the Tour de France and Giro d'Italia, there are no individual time trials or team time trials. The tour was planned this way reportedly because the promoters wanted to minimise time and effort spent in recording and sorting race results.

Past winners

References

External links

Statistics at the-sports.org
Tour de Korea at cqranking.com

Cycle races in South Korea
UCI Asia Tour races
Recurring sporting events established in 2000
2000 establishments in South Korea
Summer events in South Korea